Victoria Manni (born 23 August 1994) is an Italian ice dancer who previously competed for Switzerland. With her skating partner, Carlo Röthlisberger, she is the 2016 Santa Claus Cup bronze medalist, four-time Swiss national champion and the 2023 Italian national silver medalist. They competed in the final segment at the 2020 European Championships.

Personal life 
Victoria Manni was born on 23 August 1994 in Milan, Italy. She studied at Università Cattolica del Sacro Cuore. She is the daughter of Italian skating coach Franca Bianconi.

Career

Early years 
Manni began learning to skate in 1998. Early in her career, she represented Italy in ladies' singles, coached by Franca Bianconi and Karel Fajfr. From 2010 to 2012, she competed at three ISU Junior Grand Prix events.

Manni's first ice dancing partner was Andrea Fabbri. In 2014, she teamed up with Benjamin Naggiar to compete for Italy in senior ice dancing. The two placed tenth at the 2014 International Cup of Nice in October and seventh at the Italian Championships a couple of months later. They were coached by Valter Rizzo and Brunilde Bianchi in Sesto San Giovanni.

During the 2015–16 season, Manni represented Italy with Saverio Giacomelli. The two appeared at four internationals, including two ISU Challenger Series events.

2016–2017 season: Debut of Manni/Röthlisberger 
In 2016, Manni teamed up with Swiss ice dancer Carlo Röthlisberger to compete for Switzerland. They decided to train in Milan, coached by Roberto Pelizzola. Making their international debut, the duo placed 14th at the 2016 CS Tallinn Trophy in November. They placed 25th at the 2017 European Championships in Ostrava, Czech Republic.

2017–2018 season 
Manni/Röthlisberger finished 23rd at the 2018 European Championships in Moscow, Russia. Barbara Fusar-Poli, Stefano Caruso, and Pelizzola served as their coaches.

2018–2019 season 
Manni/Röthlisberger competed for the first time at both Europeans and Worlds but did not reach the free dance at either event. They ranked 24th in the short dance at the 2019 European Championships in Minsk, Belarus, and 23rd at the 2019 World Championships in Saitama, Japan. They finished ninth at the 2019 Winter Universiade in Krasnoyarsk, Russia. It was their final season training in Assago under Fusar-Poli, Caruso, and Pelizzola.

2019–2020 season 
Manni/Röthlisberger decided to train in Zürich, Switzerland, coached by Alexander Gazsi. At the 2020 European Championships in Graz (Austria), they qualified to the free dance and finished twentieth overall.

Programs

With Röthlisberger

Ladies' singles

Competitive highlights 
CS: Challenger Series; JGP: Junior Grand Prix

Ice dancing with Röthlisberger for Italy

Ice dancing with Röthlisberger for Switzerland

Ice dancing with Giacomelli for Italy

Ice dancing with Naggiar for Italy

Ladies' singles for Italy

References

External links 

 

1994 births
Italian female ice dancers
Swiss female ice dancers
Living people
Figure skaters from Milan
Competitors at the 2019 Winter Universiade